Čestibor was a 9th-century King of the Lusatian Serbs (Sorbs). He was a vassal of Louis the German. In 856 he led the Sorbs into battle alongside King Louis against the Glomacze tribe, defeating them and putting them under German rule. Shortly after in 859, the Sorbs had risen against Čestibor and killed him, causing a rebellion against King Louis.

References 

9th-century Slavs
859 deaths
Early Sorbian people
Year of birth unknown
Slavic warriors